Hteiktin Pu (1813 – 1882), commonly known as Prince of Pyinzi, was a royal prince during the late Konbaung dynasty, especially famous for his classical Mahāgīta songs.

Biography
Hteiktin Pu was born in 1813 to Prince of Toungoo, a younger brother of King Bagyidaw, and Princess of Tagaung.

Hteiktin Pu died in 1882.

Works
Among the five Pyinzi princes of the Konbaung dynasty, those who showed the most interest in Mahāgīta were Maung Naga and Hteiktin Pu. Although they both composed Mahāgīta songs, no Mahagita books described clearly which songs were written by which Prince of Pyinzi.

The famous Mahāgīta songs Hteiktin Pu composed were:
 Myan Char Mye Ko patpyoe (မြန်ချာမြေကို ပတ်ပျိုး)
 Celebration song of Mandalay started with Mingalar Thiri Mye Myatswa (မင်္ဂလာသီရိမြေမြတ်စွာ အစချီ မန္တလေးမြို့ဘွဲ့)
 Taung Zambu Paing Thai-adapted song (တောင်ဇမ္ဗူပိုင် ယိုးဒယား)
 Wei Zayantar Nanbon Thai-adapted song (ဝေဇယန္တာနန်းဘုံ ယိုးဒယား).

Issue
Hteiktin Pu had three children: Hteiktin Wint, Hteiktin Kyi and Hteiktin Nyo.

King Mindon conferred the title of Minye Thinkayar to Hteiktin Wint in 1882.

Hteiktin Kyi followed her father's footsteps— she also composed Mahagita songs. There were Hteiktin Kyi's eight patpyoes in "Sabba Gitakkama Pasānadī"  manuscript.

Hteiktin Nyo published the novel "Dadhivāhana and Pāsādacandi" Volume I in 1906 and Volume II in 1908.

Notes

References

Konbaung dynasty
1813 births
1882 deaths
Burmese princes